National Disaster Management Authority may refer to:

 National Disaster Management Authority (India), India
 National Disaster Management Authority (Pakistan), Pakistan